The 1940 Brooklyn Dodgers finished the season in second place. It was their best finish in 16 years.

Offseason 
 December 8, 1939: Al Todd was traded by the Dodgers to the Chicago Cubs for Gus Mancuso and Newt Kimball.
 December 26, 1939: Boze Berger was purchased by the Dodgers from the Boston Red Sox.
 February 6, 1940: Herman Franks was purchased by the Dodgers from the St. Louis Cardinals.
 February 12, 1940: Joe Vosmik was purchased by the Dodgers from the Boston Red Sox.
 Prior to 1940 season: Wally Westlake was signed as an amateur free agent by the Dodgers.

Regular season

Season standings

Record vs. opponents

Notable transactions 

 April 3, 1940: Jim Winford was purchased from the Dodgers by the St. Louis Cardinals.
 April 11, 1940: Tony Giuliani was purchased by the Dodgers from the Washington Senators.
 April 11, 1940: Al Hollingsworth was purchased from the Dodgers by the Washington Senators.
 April 28, 1940: Roy Hughes was purchased by the Dodgers from the Philadelphia Phillies.
 May 14, 1940: Goody Rosen was purchased from the Dodgers by the Pittsburgh Pirates.
 May 25, 1940: Jimmy Wasdell was purchased by the Dodgers from the Washington Senators.
 May 27, 1940: Roy Cullenbine was traded by the Dodgers to the St. Louis Browns for Joe Gallagher.
 May 29, 1940: Gene Moore was purchased from the Dodgers by the Boston Bees.
 June 12, 1940: Ernie Koy, Carl Doyle, Sam Nahem, Bert Haas and cash were traded by the Dodgers to the St. Louis Cardinals for Joe Medwick and Curt Davis.
 June 13, 1940: Ira Hutchinson was purchased from the Dodgers by the St. Louis Cardinals.
 July 30, 1940: Tuck Stainback was purchased from the Dodgers by the Detroit Tigers.
 August 2, 1940: Wes Flowers was purchased by the Dodgers from the Boston Red Sox.
 August 23, 1940: Jimmy Ripple was selected off waivers from the Dodgers by the Cincinnati Reds.

Roster

Player stats

Batting

Starters by position 
Note: Pos = Position; G = Games played; AB = At bats; R = Runs; H = Hits; Avg. = Batting average; HR = Home runs; RBI = Runs batted in; SB = Stolen bases

Other batters 
Note: G = Games played; AB = At bats; R = Runs; H = Hits; Avg. = Batting average; HR = Home runs; RBI = Runs batted in; SB = Stolen bases

Pitching

Starting pitchers 
Note: G = Games pitched; GS = Games started; CG = Complete games; IP = Innings pitched; W = Wins; L = Losses; ERA = Earned run average; BB = Bases on balls; SO = Strikeouts

Other pitchers 
Note: G = Games pitched; GS = Games started; CG = Complete games; IP = Innings pitched; W = Wins; L = Losses; ERA = Earned run average; BB = Bases on balls; SO = Strikeouts

Relief pitchers 
Note: G = Games pitched; IP = Innings pitched; W = Wins; L = Losses; SV = Saves; ERA = Earned run average; BB = Bases on balls; SO = Strikeouts

Awards and honors 
1940 Major League Baseball All-Star Game
Cookie Lavagetto starter
Joe Medwick starter
Leo Durocher reserve
Pete Coscarart reserve
Babe Phelps reserve
Whit Wyatt reserve

League top ten finishers 
Dolph Camilli
 #3 in NL in slugging percentage (.529)
 #3 in NL in bases on balls (89)
 #4 in NL in home runs (23)
 #4 in NL in on-base percentage (.397)

Whit Wyatt
 #2 in NL in strikeouts (124)

Farm system 

LEAGUE CHAMPIONS: Knoxville

Notes

References 
Baseball-Reference season page
Baseball Almanac season page

External links 
1940 Brooklyn Dodgers uniform
Brooklyn Dodgers reference site
Acme Dodgers page 
Retrosheet

Los Angeles Dodgers seasons
Brooklyn Dodgers season
Brooklyn
1940s in Brooklyn
Flatbush, Brooklyn